Mezőkovácsháza is a district in southern part of Békés County. Mezőkovácsháza is also the name of the town where the district seat is found. The district is located in the Southern Great Plain Statistical Region.

Geography 
Mezőkovácsháza District borders with Békéscsaba District to the north, Gyula District to the northeast, the Romanian county of Arad to the east and south, Makó District (Csongrád County) and Orosháza District to the west. The number of the inhabited places in Mezőkovácsháza District is 18.

Municipalities 
The district has 4 towns, 2 large villages and 12 villages.
(ordered by population, as of 1 January 2012)

The bolded municipalities are cities, italics municipalities are large villages.

Demographics

In 2011, it had a population of 40,550 and the population density was 46/km².

Ethnicity
Besides the Hungarian majority, the main minorities are the Romanian and Roma (approx. 1,000), German (500), Slovak (400) and Serb (350).

Total population (2011 census): 40,550
Ethnic groups (2011 census): Identified themselves: 38,098 persons:
Hungarians: 34,751 (91.21%)
Romanians: 1,021 (2.68%)
Gypsies: 911 (2.39%)
Germans: 488 (1.28%)
Slovaks: 402 (1.06%)
Others and indefinable: 525 (1.38%)
Approx. 2,500 persons in Mezőkovácsháza District did not declare their ethnic group at the 2011 census.

Religion
Religious adherence in the county according to 2011 census:

Catholic – 15,730 (Roman Catholic – 15,633; Greek Catholic – 94);
Reformed – 2,272;
Evangelical – 1,280;
Orthodox – 630;
other religions – 487; 
Non-religious – 10,704; 
Atheism – 350;
Undeclared – 9,097.

Gallery

See also
List of cities and towns of Hungary

References

External links
 Postal codes of the Mezőkovácsháza District

Districts in Békés County